The 2018–19 UMBC Retrievers women's basketball team represents the University of Maryland, Baltimore County during the 2018–19 NCAA Division I women's basketball season. The Retrievers, initially led by seventeenth year head coach Phil Stern, play their home games at UMBC Event Center and are members of the America East Conference.

On February 22, 2019, Stern, who had been on administrative leave since December 13, 2018, announced his resignation from UMBC. Assistant coach Carlee Cassidy-Dewey served as interim head coach during Stern's initial leave, and continued in that role following his resignation.

Media
All non-televised home games and conference road games will stream on either ESPN3 or AmericaEast.tv. Most road games will stream on the opponents website. Select games will be broadcast on the radio on WQLL-1370 AM.

Roster

Schedule

|-
!colspan=9 style=| Non-conference regular season

|-
!colspan=9 style=| America East regular season

|-
!colspan=9 style=| America East Women's Tournament

See also
2018–19 UMBC Retrievers men's basketball team

References

UMBC
UMBC Retrievers women's basketball seasons
UMBC
UMBC